Franz Weinberger is a Swiss bobsledder who competed in the early 1980s. He won a silver medal in the four-man event at the 1981 FIBT World Championships in Cortina d'Ampezzo.

References
Bobsleigh four-man world championship medalists since 1930

Living people
Swiss male bobsledders
Year of birth missing (living people)
Place of birth missing (living people)
20th-century Swiss people